KOZI may refer to:

 KOZI (AM), a radio station (1230 AM) licensed to Chelan, Washington, United States
 KOZI-FM, a radio station (93.5 FM) licensed to Chelan, Washington, United States